This is a list of major World War II surface warships built by the belligerent minor powers. Each entry into this list is a purpose-built naval ship with a displacement greater than 1,000 tons. If her full displacement exceeds 1,000 tons but the standard displacement is below this number, the warship is marked with an asterisk at the end of her name. Only vessels in commission by the end of the war qualify for this list.

A minor power in the context of the Second World War is any country that was not one of the era's Great Powers.
A major warship of the Second World War is any naval vessel with a displacement greater than 1,000 tons, as opposed to minor warships.

Allies

Brazil

Denmark

Netherlands

Norway

Yugoslavia

Axis

Finland

Romania

References 

Lists of World War II ships
World War II naval ships